Rauf Huseynli (born on 25 January 2000) is an Azerbaijani footballer who plays as a defender for Shamakhi FK in the Azerbaijan Premier League and the Azerbaijan U21.

Club career
Huseynli made his debut in the Azerbaijan Premier League for Zira on 1 February 2020,  match against Zira.

References

External links
 
 Rauf Huseynli at www.uefa.com

2000 births
Living people
Association football defenders
Azerbaijani footballers
Qarabağ FK players
Zira FK players
Azerbaijan Premier League players
Azerbaijan under-21 international footballers
Azerbaijan youth international footballers